Thompson Danby (10 August 1926 – 26 December 2022) was an English dual-code international rugby union, and professional rugby league footballer who played in the 1940s and 1950s.

Background
Born in Trimdon, County Durham, he signed for Salford in August 1949, and in doing so, he became the first England rugby union international recruited by Salford. He attended St John's College, York between 1943 and 1945.

International honours
Danby won a cap for England (RU) in the 2–0 defeat by Wales on 15 January 1949.

Danby won cap s for England (RL) while at Salford in 1950 against Wales (two matches), and France, and won cap s for Great Britain (RL) while at Salford in 1950 against Australia (two matches), and New Zealand.

Personal life and death
Tom Danby married Audrey Winifred Spencer (better known as "Penny" Spencer) on 26 June 1948 in Brighton. They had children; Christine H. Danby was born in Brighton in 1954 and Peter was born in 1956. After retiring from rugby Danby taught at Shebbear College for over 30 years.  

Danby died at his home in East Sussex on 26 December 2022, at the age of 96. At the time of his death, Danby was the oldest surviving member of a Great Britain rugby league team.

References

External links

1926 births
2022 deaths
Dual-code rugby internationals
England international rugby union players
England national rugby league team players
English rugby league players
English rugby union players
Great Britain national rugby league team players
Harlequin F.C. players
People educated at Barnard Castle School
People from Trimdon
Rugby league players from County Durham
Rugby league wingers
Rugby union players from County Durham
Rugby union wings
Salford Red Devils players